Maloy is a city in southwest Ringgold County, Iowa, United States, along the Platte River. The population was 22 at the time of the 2020 census.

History
Settlement of the western part of Ringgold County began in the 1850s.  Maloy was platted in 1887, in the same year as the railroad arrived.  Maloy was incorporated as a city in 1901.  In 1917, the two-story brick Maloy High School was built; after serving from 1920 to 1952, it became an elementary school in the Mount Ayr Community School District.

A major fire on June 17, 1931, razed the Catholic Church, five businesses, a house, and a barn.   The school closed in 1972 and was torn down in 1987.  The railroad, which once offered both freight and passenger service, was dismantled in 1985.

Today, the city is governed by a mayor and three-member city council.

Geography
Maloy is on Iowa County Road J43 approximately ten miles west-southwest of Mount Ayr. The Platte River flows past the west side of the community.

Demographics

2010 census
As of the census of 2010, there were 29 people in 12 households, including 10 families, in the city. The racial makup of the city was 100.0% White.

Of the 12 households 33.3% had children under the age of 18 living with them, 75.0% were married couples living together, 8.3% had a male householder with no wife present, and 16.7% were non-families. 16.7% of households were one person and 8.3% were one person aged 65 or older. The average household size was 2.42 and the average family size was 2.60.

The median age was 42.5 years. 20.7% of residents were under the age of 18; 13.7% were between the ages of 18 and 24; 24% were from 25 to 44; 20.5% were from 45 to 64; and 20.7% were 65 or older. The gender makeup of the city was 62.1% male and 37.9% female.

2000 census
As of the census of 2000, there were 28 people in 10 households, including 7 families, in the city. There were 11 housing units at an average density of 17.7 per square mile (6.9/km). The racial makup of the city was 100.00% White.

Of the 10 households 50.0% had children under the age of 18 living with them, 50.0% were married couples living together, 10.0% had a female householder with no husband present, and 30.0% were non-families. 20.0% of households were one person and 10.0% were one person aged 65 or older. The average household size was 2.80 and the average family size was 3.29.

The age distribution was 32.1% under the age of 18, 7.1% from 18 to 24, 28.6% from 25 to 44, 14.3% from 45 to 64, and 17.9% 65 or older. The median age was 36 years. For every 100 females, there were 86.7 males. For every 100 females age 18 and over, there were 90.0 males.

The median income for a household in the city is $36,250, and the median family income  was $13,750. Males had a median income of $16,250 versus $11,875 for females. The per capita income for the city was $10,386. There were 50.0% of families and 42.9% of the population living below the poverty line, including 55.6% of under eighteens and none of those over 64.

Education
Mount Ayr Community School District operates public schools serving the community.

Notable person
Luke E. Hart, tenth Supreme Knight of the Knights of Columbus

References

External links

 
City-Data Comprehensive statistical data and more about Maloy

Cities in Iowa
Cities in Ringgold County, Iowa
Populated places established in 1887
1887 establishments in Iowa